The St. Francis Pro-Cathedral or simply Church of St. Francis, is a Roman Catholic church located in the city of Tripoli, Libya.

Cathedral
The St. Francis Pro-Cathedral serves as a parish church and the pro-cathedral or temporary cathedral of the Latin Church Apostolic Vicariate of Tripoli (Vicariatus Apostolicus Tripolitanus) which was created in 1630 by Pope Urban VIII.

It is about 740 metres from the old cathedral of Tripoli dating back to 1928, which was converted into a mosque in 1970. It is run by the Franciscans of the Province of St. Paul the Apostle (Malta) with the church of Mary Immaculate in Benghazi.

See also
Roman Catholicism in Libya
Pro-Cathedral

References

Roman Catholic cathedrals in Libya
Buildings and structures in Tripoli, Libya